Peter Burke Wood (1 February 1867 – 15 March 1923) was a Canadian-American professional baseball pitcher. A right-hander, he played parts of two seasons in Major League Baseball, 1885 and 1889.

A native of Dundas, Ontario, Wood made his major league debut on 15 July 1885 with the Buffalo Bisons, the team which also featured on its roster his brother, Fred. The brothers were with the team for the remainder of the season, at the end of which Fred retired. Four years later, Wood returned to Major League Baseball, playing for the Philadelphia Quakers in 1889. His final game with the team was on September 7.

Pete Wood died in Chicago six weeks past his 56th birthday.

External links

Pete Wood Stats at Baseball Almanac

1867 births
1923 deaths
19th-century baseball players
Baseball players from Hamilton, Ontario
Buffalo Bisons (minor league) players
Buffalo Bisons (NL) players
Canadian expatriate baseball players in the United States
Hamilton Primrose players
Hamilton Clippers players
Hamilton Hams players
London (minor league baseball) players
London Tecumsehs (baseball) players
Major League Baseball pitchers
Major League Baseball players from Canada
Philadelphia Quakers players
People from Dundas, Ontario
Toronto Canucks players